The Bay Run is a 7-kilometre-long pedestrian and cycling circuit around Iron Cove passing through the suburbs of Rozelle, Lilyfield, Haberfield, Five Dock, Rodd Point. Russell Lea and Drummoyne. in the Inner West of Sydney, New South Wales, Australia. The Bay Run provides excellent views of Iron Cove for its entire course as it constantly hugs the shoreline. The Bay Run is popular with joggers, walkers, roller skaters and cyclists who enjoy the pleasant waterside scenery while exercising. The Bay Run plays host to the annual Bay Run fun run, a community event that brings people together in the name of health, fun and exercise.

The Bay Run has separate facilities for cyclists and pedestrians, and those on foot are prohibited from encroaching on the dedicated cycleway.

Route

From the mouth of Iron Cove Creek at Timbrell Drive, Five Dock, The Bay Run follows the western shore of Iron Cove running parallel to Henley Marine Drive. Originally a narrow gravel footpath, upgrades over the last decade have seen most of the section along Henley Marine Drive reconstructed to provide a wider separated pathway accommodating both pedestrians and cyclists. Most recently, upgrade of the section between Thompson Street and Formosa Street was completed in 2014 as part of the Bay Run Stage 5 project. For a long time a missing link, this marks a significant milestone for the Bay Run in that pedestrians and cyclists now have a dedicated path separate to road traffic generally throughout the entire Bay Run loop.

At Formosa Street, Drummoyne, The Bay Run leaves Henley Marine Drive and traverses the Iron Cove Bridge to the Rozelle side, where it turns right and follows the eastern shore of Iron Cove. Here it passes through King George Park and Callan Park in Lilyfield, where there is a short section of shared road.  After the Callan Park playing fields the path resumes and continues to Leichhardt Park, passing the Leichhardt Rowing Club. The Bay Run continues along Maliyawul Street to Lilyfield Road. It then uses the (now closed to motor traffic) road bridge over Hawthorne Canal and parallels the City West Link Road at Haberfield, passing the Haberfield Rowers Club. The Bay Run then continues along the foreshore of Iron Cove to the mouth of Iron Cove Creek where it completes its circuit.

At the mouth of the Hawthorne Canal, near the junction of Hawthorne Parade, Lilyfield Road, Maliyawul Street, and Dobroyd Parade, there is the option to add an additional  to the loop circuit by heading south until crossing the footbridge on Barton Street and returning north up the other side of the canal.

See also
Bike paths in Sydney
Cycling in New South Wales
Cycling in Sydney

References

External links
Map of Free Drinking Water En-Route
The Bay Run fun run website
The Bay Run plotted on MapMyRun.com
The Annual 65K 4 65Roses Walkathon held at the Bay Run
City of Canada Bay description of the Bay Run

Cycleways in Australia
Cycling in Sydney